The 2015–16 KBL season was the 20th season of the Korean Basketball League (KBL), the highest level of basketball in South Korea. Goyang Orion Orions won its first KBL championship since the 2001–2002 season.

Clubs

Regular season

Playoffs

References

External links
  

Korean Basketball League seasons
2015–16 in South Korean basketball